Attica Junior-Senior High School is a middle school and high school located in Attica, Indiana.

See also
 List of high schools in Indiana

References

External links
 

Public high schools in Indiana
Buildings and structures in Fountain County, Indiana